Moira Katherine Brigid Whyte  FERS (born 25 September 1959) is a Scottish physician and medical researcher who is the Sir John Crofton Professor of Respiratory Medicine at the University of Edinburgh. She is the Director the Medical Research Council Centre for Inflammation Research and is Vice-Principal and Head of the College of Medicine and Veterinary Medicine at the University of Edinburgh. Whyte is also a trustee of Cancer Research UK.

Early life and education
Moira Katherine Brigid Whyte was born on 25 September 1959. Her parents are Maurice and Anne Whyte. She was educated at the Convent of Notre Dame, Plymouth and Plymouth College before going on to study medicine at St Bartholomew's Hospital Medical College. She worked and studied at Hammersmith Hospital, Royal Postgraduate Medical School and Imperial Cancer Research Fund. Whyte completed clinical fellowships funded by the Medical Research Council and Wellcome Trust.

Career and research

Whyte became Professor of Respiratory Medicine at the University of Sheffield in 1996, subsequently becoming Head of the Department of Infection and Immunity. In 2014 Whyte moved to become the Professor of Respiratory Medicine at the University of Edinburgh and in 2016, Whyte became Head of the University of Edinburgh Medical School succeeding John Iredale, having become Director of the MRC University of Edinburgh Centre for Inflammation Research in 2015.

Whyte was previously an honorary officer and Registrar of the Academy of Medical Sciences from 2012 to 2016. Whyte is active in the Medical Research Council as the Chair of their Clinical Training and Careers Panel and was formerly a Member of the Medical Research Council Population and Systems Medicine Board and was also Deputy Chair of the Medical Research Council/National Institute for Health Research Efficacy and Mechanisms Evaluation Board.

In April 2018, Whyte took up the position of Vice-Principal and Head of the College of Medicine and Veterinary Medicine. She succeeded Professor Sir John Savill and Professor David Argyle in this role. The University of Edinburgh College of Medicine and Veterinary Medicine is one of three colleges at the University of Edinburgh and has over 3000 students and 2000 members of staff. The College includes the Royal (Dick) School of Veterinary Studies and the University of Edinburgh Medical School.

Whyte is also an Honorary Consultant Physician and was a member of the NHS Lothian Health Board.

Whyte's research is described by the University of Edinburgh as "focused on chronic inflammatory lung diseases and understanding of host defences against bacterial infection in the lung" and Whyte was one of the European Respiratory Society 100 Foundation Fellows in 2014. Whyte also has her role as Director of the MRC University of Edinburgh Centre for Inflammation Research.

In 2020, Whyte was appointed a trustee of Cancer Research UK.

Awards and honours
Whyte was appointed Officer of the Order of the British Empire for services to respiratory medicine in the 2014 New Year Honours. In 2018, she was elected a Fellow of the Royal Society of Edinburgh and is also a Fellow of the Academy of Medical Sciences.

References 
  

Academics of the University of Edinburgh
Academics of the University of Sheffield
Officers of the Order of the British Empire
Living people
20th-century British medical doctors
21st-century British medical doctors
1959 births
Scottish women medical doctors
Fellows of the Royal College of Physicians
Fellows of the Royal Society of Edinburgh
Fellows of the Academy of Medical Sciences (United Kingdom)
20th-century women physicians
21st-century women physicians
British immunologists